Konstanty Wasyl Ostrogski (2 February 1526 – 13 or 23 February 1608, also known as Kostiantyn Vasyl Ostrozkyi) was a Ruthenian Orthodox magnate of the Polish–Lithuanian Commonwealth, a prince, starost of Volodymyr, marshal of Volhynia and voivode of the Kiev Voivodeship. Ostrogski refused to help False Dmitriy I and supported Jan Zamoyski.

The date of birth of Konstanty Wasyl Ostrogski is disputed. According to some historians he was born around 1524/1525.

He was born probably in Turów.

In the 1570s he waged a war against another magnate, Stanisław Tarnowski, about disputed possession of estates in the area of Tarnów, in Lesser Poland.

Prince Ostrogski was of Eastern Orthodox faith and he was active in supporting the Orthodox Church (see Union of Brest). He was also a promoter of Eastern Christian culture in the Polish–Lithuanian Commonwealth. Around 1576  he established the Ostroh Academy, a wellregarded humanist educational and scholarship institution, with the instruction in Greek, Latin and Old Church Slavonic languages. In 1581 the academy produced and published the Ostroh Bible, the first complete printed edition of the Bible in Old Church Slavonic.

Ostrogski's huge latifundium, or landed estate in the eastern Polish–Lithuanian Commonwealth, consisted of 100 towns and 1300 villages.  It was Ostrogski who built Starokostiantyniv Castle.

Ostroh boasted an Orthodox academy, a yeshiva, a mosque, and a Unitarian Church.

While Konstanty Wasyl Ostrogski was the proponent of the Eastern Orthodox religion, his son Janusz Ostrogski converted to Roman Catholicism.

He married in January 1553 in Tarnów.

Canonized in the Orthodox Church of Ukraine as a Right-Believing prince.

See also
Ostrogski family
Starokostiantyniv Castle

References

External links

 Ostrozky, Kostiantyn Vasyl / Ostrozky in the Encyclopedia of Ukraine, vol. 3 (1993) 
 a chapter of the "History of Russia" by Mykola Kostomarov devoted to "Knyaz Konstantin Konstantinovich Ostrozhskiy" 

1526 births
1608 deaths
People from Ostroh
Ruthenian nobility of the Polish–Lithuanian Commonwealth
Eastern Orthodox Christians from Poland
Konstanty Wasyl
Secular senators of the Polish–Lithuanian Commonwealth
Military personnel of the Polish–Lithuanian Commonwealth
Voivodes of Kiev